Fair Hooker (born May 22, 1947) is a former American football wide receiver in the National Football League (NFL). He was drafted by the Cleveland Browns in the fifth round of the 1969 NFL Draft. He played college football at Arizona State.

1947 births
Living people
American football wide receivers
Arizona State Sun Devils football players
Cleveland Browns players
Players of American football from Los Angeles